Adi Vishnu is a 2008 Indian Telugu-language action drama film directed by Bharat Parepalli and starring Dasari Arunkumar and Sneha.

Cast 

Dasari Arunkumar as Vishnu
Sneha as Anjali
Suman as Manservant
Pradeep Rawat as Yadagiri 
Kota Srinivasa Rao as Vishnu's father
Aishwarya as Jakkamma 
Jeeva as Investigation officer
Salim Baig
Ali
Venu Madhav
Satyam Rajesh
Sunil
M. S. Narayana
M. Balayya
Geetanjali
Prema
Surekha Vani

Production 
The film marks the directorial debut of Venugopal, who previously worked as an assistant director to Dasari Narayana Rao. The film completed shooting as of 24 July 2008.

Soundtrack 
The audio launch for the film was held on 27 July 2008 with celebrities including Rajinikanth, Mohan Babu in attendance. All songs were penned by Chandrabose except the song "Ramaa Ramaa" which Bhaskara Bhatla wrote.

"Aadi Naa Manase Needhi" - Rita , S.P. Balasubrahmanyam
"Edu Rangula Harivillu" - K.S. Chithra, Jeans Srinivas
"Ee Pani Chesthunna" - Murali , K.S. Chithra
"Peechu Meetai" - Sukhwinder Singh, Sangeetha Rajeev
"Ramaa Ramaa" - Tippu

Reception 
A critic from Filmibeat wrote that "As a whole, Arunkumar has once again faced disappointment with poor storyline". A critic from 123Telugu said that "It is tough to believe that he [Dasari Narayana Rao] is writing such regressive scripts for his son – almost seems like he does not want Arun to succeed in filmdom". A critic from Full Hyderabad wrote that "Aadi Vishnu is such a lousy movie, you have to watch 10 lousier movies after that and then watch it again to feel better about the money and time you spent on it".

References 

2000s Telugu-language films
Films scored by M. M. Srilekha